The Clemson Tigers men's basketball teams of 1930–1939 represented Clemson Agricultural College in NCAA college basketball competition.

1929–30

1930–31

Some games were cancelled due to a meningitis quarantine on campus.

1931–32

1932–33

1933–34

1934–35

1935–36

1936–37

1937–38

1938–39

References

Games: 
Coaches: 

1930